NH 141 may refer to:

 National Highway 141 (India)
 New Hampshire Route 141, United States